Leslie Charles Lobb (5 September 1894 – 3 March 1970) was an Australian rules footballer who played with Collingwood in the Victorian Football League (VFL).

Notes

External links 

Les Lobb's profile at Collingwood Forever

1894 births
1970 deaths
Australian rules footballers from Melbourne
Collingwood Football Club players
People from Surrey Hills, Victoria